Joachim Friedrich Christian von Tresckow ( 28 September 1698 in Niegripp bei Magdeburg– 20 April 1762 in Neisse) was a Prussian Lieutenant General, Proprietor of the Prussian Infantry Regiment Nr. 32.  He was a Knight of the Black Eagle Order and a recipient of the Order Pour le Mérite.  He served Frederick the Great in the War of Austrian Succession and the Seven Years' War.

Citations

1698 births
1762 deaths
Prussian military personnel of the Seven Years' War
Lieutenant generals of Prussia
Recipients of the Pour le Mérite (military class)
Treskow family